The Flea Market Cup is a professional tennis tournament played on outdoor hard courts. It is part of the ATP Challenger Tour. The tournament, which started in 2005, was held in Busan, South Korea during 2003–08, and the location has been moved to Chuncheon in 2009.

Past finals

Singles

Doubles

References
South Korean Tennis Federation official website
ITF search 

ATP Challenger Tour
Tretorn SERIE+ tournaments
Hard court tennis tournaments
Tennis tournaments in South Korea
Recurring sporting events established in 2003
Sport in Gangwon Province, South Korea
Sport in Busan